Dalhart High School is a public high school located in Dalhart, Texas (USA) and classified as a 3A school by the UIL. Serving more than 400 students in grades 9-12, Dalhart High School is part of the Dalhart Independent School District which covers much of both Dallam and Hartley counties. In 2015, the school was rated "Met Standard" by the Texas Education Agency.

Athletics
The Dalhart Golden Wolves compete in the following sports:

Baseball
Basketball
Cross Country
Football
Golf
Powerlifting
Softball
Tennis
Track and Field
Volleyball

On September 1, 2022, Dalhart sophomore Yahir Cancino was knocked unconscious while competing for the Golden Wolves' junior varsity football team in a game against Sundown that was played in Dimmitt.  He was airlifted to University Medical Center in Lubbock, where he died from his injuries two days later.

References

External links
Dalhart ISD website

Schools in Dallam County, Texas
Public high schools in Texas